Ilex toroidea is a small tree in the family Aquifoliaceae. It is endemic to Papua New Guinea, occurring at 700–820 metres above sea level.

References

toroidea